Abonti Biswas (born 11 October 1984) known by her stage name as Apu Biswas, is a Bangladeshi film actress, model and the former wife of notable Bangladeshi actor Shakib Khan. Biswas made her debut in the film industry with the film Kal Shokale in 2006. She then performed in Koti Takar Kabin. In many of her videos she has co-starred with shakib khan.

Early life
Biswas was born on 11 October 1989 as Abonti Biswas in Bogra district of Bangladesh to Upendronath Bishwas (d. 2014) and Shefali Bishwas (d. 2020). Upendronath Bishwas and Shefali Biswas had three daughters and one son. Among siblings actress Apu Biswas is the youngest. Apu's only brother Uttom Kumar Biswas lives in Katnarpara SK Lane in Bogra. Apu's elder sister Mili Biswas lives in Bogra and younger sister Lata Biswas lives in Siliguri, India.

Career
Biswas made her debut in the film industry with the film Kal Shokale in 2006. She then performed in Koti Takar Kabin. Biswas played the role of Parvati in the 2013 Bangladeshi remake of Devdas. She performed in the 2013 film My Name Is Khan.

Personal life
In 2008, Biswas married actor Shakib Khan. The couple has a son, Abraam Khan Joy (born September 27, 2016). They had kept their marriage a secret until 10 April 2017 when Apu appeared on television with her son and revealed it.

Shakib Khan filed for a divorce on 22 November 2017, and the couple was divorced on 22 February 2018.  She converted to Islam after her marriage and renamed as Apu Islam Khan, however, later reverted to Hinduism after her divorce.

Filmography

References

Further reading

External links

 Apu Biswas Biography at Local celebrity
 
 

Living people
Bengali Hindus
Bangladeshi Hindus
Bangladeshi film actresses
People from Bogra District
1989 births
Best Actress Bachsas Award winners
Bangladeshi former Muslims
Converts to Hinduism from Islam